Lois June Ramsey (18 June 1922 –  22 January 2016) also billed as Lois Ramsay,  was an Australian actress, best known for her regular roles on television series  The Box and Prisoner as two different characters. As a character actress of both drama and comic roles in numerous serials, she often played quirky, eccentric old ladies on television soap operas.

Career

The Box and Prisoner
She was a major cast member of the 1970s soap opera The Box as tea lady Mrs. Hopkins, appearing for the entire run of the serial. She also had 2 prominent stints in Prisoner—firstly as dotty social worker Agnes Forster in 1980 in 1985 as an elderly inmate Ettie Parslow, who thought that the Second World War was still going on.

Television and film roles
She had numerous roles in TV soap opera/serials including Crawford Productions serials Homicide, The Sullivans, Cop Shop,  as well as A Country Practice, E Street, Home and Away, and Blue Heelers, Always Greener and All Saints and the films Crackerjack and BoyTown. 
 
AFI Award for Best Performance by an Actress in a Guest Role in a Television Drama Series for a performance in the television series Grass Roots.

Stage roles
Also a stage actress, she was one of the founders of the Flinders Street Revue Company in 1961 and appeared later she appeared in numerous productions with both the Sydney Theatre Company and the Melbourne Theatre Company.

Personal life
Born to Bill and Maud Dickson, she married Cuthbert Ward Ramsey on 25 September 1943. They had two children: writer/director Stephen Ramsey and the late actress Penny Ramsey.

Filmography

FILM

TELEVISION

References

External links
 

1922 births
2016 deaths
AACTA Award winners
Actresses from Adelaide
Australian film actresses
Australian soap opera actresses
Australian stage actresses
20th-century Australian actresses
21st-century Australian actresses